Williamsburg General Hospital was the final name of a Brooklyn hospital that opened in the late 19th century and both moved and changed names more than once. One of these names is associated with "Brooklyn's first woman ambulance surgeon," Mary Crawford. Today that location houses an apartment building and an earlier one became a playground.

History
The hospital had several names and was associated with no fewer than five locations.

Three names used by the hospital were:
 Brooklyn Throat Hospital
 Williamsburgh Hospital (Williamsburg Hospital once Williamsburg'''s "h" was dropped)
 Williamsburg General Hospital.

Five locations associated with the hospital were:
 "South 3d St. and Bedford Avenue" (at times written as Bedford Avenue and South 3rd Street)
 106 South Third StreetTalk:Williamsburg General Hospital#South 3rd Street: 106 vs. 130
 342 Bedford Avenue<ref name=WiliH342.156South9>The Real Estate Record for January 18, 1919, page 92, lists an entry for 156 South 9th Street as land purchased by Williamsburgh Hospital, then having its address listed as 342 Bedford Avenue. A more recent update indicates seven stories.
 156 South 9th Street and
 757 Bushwick Avenue.

They began as Brooklyn Throat Hospital in 1859 and were listed in the 1897 Annual Report of the New York State Board of Welfare as
Dispensary of the Brooklyn Throat Hospital. They were renamed Williamsburgh Hospital and subsequently Williamsburg General Hospital.

The 757 Bushwick Avenue structure that housed the hospital's last location was torn down and, in 1970, rebuilt as an apartment building.
 In 1936 the 106 South Third Street' structure was purchased by the city government, torn down, and became Berry Playground''.

See also
 List of hospitals in Brooklyn

References

  

Defunct hospitals in Brooklyn
Hospitals established in 1859